Davide Alexandre Pinto Dias (born 12 April 1983 in Lisbon), known simply as Davide, is a Portuguese former professional footballer who played as a right winger.

References

External links

1983 births
Living people
Footballers from Lisbon
Portuguese footballers
Association football wingers
Primeira Liga players
Liga Portugal 2 players
Campeonato de Portugal (league) players
C.F. Estrela da Amadora players
S.C. Braga players
Associação Naval 1º de Maio players
C.D. Santa Clara players
Anadia F.C. players
Cypriot First Division players
Apollon Limassol FC players
Liga I players
FC Brașov (1936) players
FC Vaslui players
Portugal youth international footballers
Portugal under-21 international footballers
Portugal B international footballers
Portuguese expatriate footballers
Expatriate footballers in Cyprus
Expatriate footballers in Romania
Portuguese expatriate sportspeople in Cyprus
Portuguese expatriate sportspeople in Romania